Chantal Daucourt (born 23 June 1966) is a Swiss professional cross-country mountain biker of the 1990s and 2000s (decade) as well as a competition ski mountaineer.

Daucourt was born in Biel/Bienne and grew up in Courroux. She works as a registered nurse at the University Hospital of Lausanne.

Selected results

Mountain biking 

 1991:
 1st, European Mountain Bike cross-country Championships
 2nd, Groesbeek, Netherlands
 3rd, Berlin, Germany
 1992:
 3rd, European Mountain Bike cross-country Championships
 3rd, UCI Mountain Bike World Cup, cross-country
 1st, Hunter Mountain, United States
 1st, Mount Snow, United States
 2nd, Kirchzarten, Germany 
 3rd, Klosters, Switzerland
 1993:
 1st, European Mountain Bike cross-country Championships
 1st, "Rund Um die Rigi" (around the Rigi), Gersau, Switzerland
 3rd, Bassano del Grappa, Italy
 3rd, Mount Snow, United States
 1994:
 2nd, Swiss Cyclo-cross Championship, Switzerland
 3rd, Lenzerheide Switzerland
 3rd, Mount Snow, United States
 1995:
 3rd, UCI Mountain Bike & Trials World Championships – Women's cross-country
 3rd, European Mountain Bike cross-country Championships
 2nd, Swiss Cyclo-cross Championship, Switzerland
 3rd, Madrid, Spain
 1996:
 3rd, Swiss Cyclo-cross Championship, Switzerland
 3rd, Hawaii, United States
 3rd, Kristiansand, Norway
 1997
 1st, European Mountain Bike cross-country Championships
 1st, Swiss Cyclo-cross Championship, Switzerland
 3rd, UCI Mountain Bike World Cup, cross-country
 2nd, Mont-Sainte-Anne, Canada
 3rd, Sankt Wendel, Germany
 1998:
 1st, Swiss Cyclo-cross Championship, Switzerland
 1st, Bern circuit, Switzerland 
 1st, Budapest, Hungary
 2nd, Canmore, Australia
 1999:
 2nd, Swiss Cyclo-cross Championship, Switzerland
 41st, UCI Road World Championships – Women's road race
 1st, Dagmersellen cyclo-cross, Switzerland
 2000:
 11th, Summer Olympics Women's cross-country mountain biking, Sydney, Australia
 10th, UCI Cyclo-cross World Championships – Women's elite
 1st, Roc d'Azur
 2nd, Swiss Cyclo-cross Championship, Switzerland

Ski mountaineering 
 2004:
 1st, Patrouille de la Maya A-course, together with Véronique Ançay and Mary-Jérôme Vaudan
 2012:
 3rd, Trophée des Gastlosen, together with Sabine Gentieu

Patrouille des Glaciers 

 2004: 3rd, together with Véronique Ançay and Mary-Jérôme Vaudan
 2008: 6th, together with Andréa Zimmermann and Sabine Gentieu
 2010: 5th, together with Sabine Gentieu and Simone Hammer

Trofeo Mezzalama 

 2009: 10th, together with Lyndsay Meyer and Cécile Pasche
 2011: 7th, together with Simone Hammer and Sabine Gentieu

References 

1966 births
Living people
Olympic cyclists of Switzerland
Cyclists at the 2000 Summer Olympics
Cross-country mountain bikers
Swiss female ski mountaineers
People from Biel/Bienne
Sportspeople from the canton of Bern